"Candy Store Rock" is a song by English rock band Led Zeppelin, released in 1976 on their album Presence. It was also released as a single in the United States, but it did not chart.

Recording
The band recorded the song at Musicland Studios in Germany. Plant sang from a wheelchair because he was recovering at the time from a car accident he had sustained in Greece. Plant considers "Candy Store Rock" to be one of his favourite songs from Presence. Jimmy Page's guitar solo is short and measured, coming in halfway through the song.

Live renditions
"Candy Store Rock" was never performed live by the band at Led Zeppelin concerts, except for a brief riff by Page at Riverfront Coliseum in Cincinnati, Ohio, on 20 April 1977. However, a one-minute improvisation was played live in concert by Page and Plant as a "Black Dog" introduction on 26 July 1995 at Wembley Arena. The song was also played live in Montreux by Page and Plant on 7 July 2001.

Reception
In a contemporary review for Presence, Stephen Davis of Rolling Stone described "Candy Store Rock" as "perfectly evoking the Los Angeles milieu in which the Zep composed [Presence]." He further described the song as sounding like "an unholy hybrid in which Buddy Holly is grafted onto the quivering stem of David Bowie."  Record World said that Led Zeppelin "[deviates] from the rigid demands of top 40, but the sound is coordinated to stand up to repeated listenings"

In a retrospective review of Presence (Deluxe Edition), Andrew Doscas of PopMatters described "Candy Store Rock" as sounding like "the prequel to 1971's "Rock and Roll"" from their fourth album.

Singer Robert Plant later described "Candy Store Rock", along with "Achilles Last Stand", as the "saving grace[s] of Presence". Plant said the song's rhythm section was inspiring to him, partly due to the album's tumultuous recording sessions.

References

Led Zeppelin songs
Songs written by Jimmy Page
Songs written by Robert Plant
1976 singles
Song recordings produced by Jimmy Page
Swan Song Records singles
British rock-and-roll songs